Les Petites Dalles (English: The Small Slabs) is a hamlet on the English Channel coast in the department of Seine-Maritime, in the Normandy region of France. The hamlet is in the communes of Sassetot-le-Mauconduit and Saint-Martin-aux-Buneaux, Seine-Maritime.

History 

Sea Captain Joseph Heuzé resided in the Petites-Dalles and participated in the evacuation of Jews towards England during the occupation in the Second World War. He was arrested by the German army yet did not give up any sensible information regardless of the fact that his brother had also been captured a few months earlier. This information was never accessible to the army as Heuzé had carefully hid encrypted notes in his boat when arrested. He was then deported to Mauthausen on the convoy on the 6th of April 1944 before dying on the 7th of September of that same year in Hartheim. Unable to partake in forced labor due to an infection, he was gazed. In tribute to his bravery and determination, his name was given to the main street of the Petites-Dalles where his descendants still reside.

People 

 Jules Verne (1828-1905)
 Michel Verne (1861-1925)
 Sissi, empress Élisabeth of Austria (1837-1898)
 Ernest Daudet (1837-1921)
 Alphonse Daudet (1840-1897)
 Gustave Eiffel (1832-1923)
 Jean-Philippe Lauer (1902-2001)
 Georges Perec (1936-1982)
 Jeanloup Sieff (1933-2000)
 Brad Pitt, for the realisation of a commercial (1963-)
 Sarah Bernhardt (1844-1923)
 Henri Poincaré (1854-1912)
 Henri Bellery-Desfontaines (1867-1909)
 Louis Leprince-Ringuet (1901-2000)
 Maryse Mourer, alias Martine Carol (1920-1967)
 Henri Opper de Blowitz (1825-1903)
 Hector Malot (1830-1907)
 Henri-Alexandre Wallon (1812-1904), politician
 Pierre Bérégovoy (1925-1993), politician
 Claude Monet (1840-1926)

References 

Seaside resorts in France
Ports and harbours of the English Channel